Charleville Castle is a Gothic-style castle located in County Offaly, Ireland, bordering the town of Tullamore, near the River Clodiagh.  It is considered one of the finest of its type in the country.

History
The first mansion house to be built on the site of Charleville Castle was by Thomas Moore circa 1641. The estate passed through the hands of Charles Moore, Lord Tullamore, grandson of Thomas, and when he died in 1674 it went via his sister Jane to Charles William Bury. Charles William was later (1806) created the 1st Earl of Charleville in a second creation of the title. The new earl decided to build a new house on the estate. Commissioned in 1798, it was designed by Francis Johnston, and was built between 1800 and 1812.

The castle was not continuously occupied, owing to the castle owners' lack of resources. Each re-opening of the house resulted in the addition of new rooms or refurbishment. This included engaging William Morris, who designed the ceiling within the dining room. The castle played host to Lord Byron, who held many parties here. The house once boasted a painting from 1789 called Henry VIII, Act V, Scene 4 by Matthew William Peters, which having been removed from the house in 1970 is now in a Canadian collection.

The castle remained uninhabited from 1912 when Colonel Howard Bury left to live in Belvedere House, County Westmeath. By 1968 the roof had been removed. Work on its restoration was commenced by Michael McMullen in 1973 and later by Constance Heavey Seaquist and Bonnie Vance. A Charitable Trust has been formed to help with the restoration.

Present day

Currently, the Charleville Castle Heritage Trust is managed by Dudley Stewart, with the day-to-day running handled by volunteers. Events held at the castle have included  "fright nights", an auction, and a play by the English Chamber Theatre called Dearest Nancy, Darling Evelyn. The Mór Festival and its successor, Castlepalooza, have been held at the castle, as has Facefest, a not-for-profit festival held in the Summer Solstice Weekend. The castle also now has the global expedition base of "The Explorers' Museum" in honour of Charles Howard-Bury.

The castle itself has been claimed to be the most haunted building and grounds in Europe, appearing on both Living TV's Most Haunted and Fox's Scariest Places on Earth. The most famous of these ghosts is that of a little girl called Harriet, who died after a fall in a staircase. It has also been visited by numerous paranormal investigators and psychics. The castle has been photographed by Sir Simon Marsden. It also appeared on Ghost Hunters International. It was also used as a filming location for Becoming Jane (2007), Northanger Abbey (2007), The Knight Before Christmas (2019) and The Green Knight (2020).  The Castle has also been used alongside "Ashford Castle" in Mayo Ireland, as a set for the "French Court" in the pilot episode of Reign (2013).

Charleville Forest, which borders the castle is classified as a Special Area of Conservation.

References

External links

Official website
Collection Of Images from 2006
IMDb filming locations
Description, history and pictures of Charleville Castle
(http://www.explorersmuseum.org)

Buildings and structures in Tullamore
Castles in County Offaly
Reportedly haunted locations in Ireland